Yuriy Vyacheslavovych Kravchuk (born 6 April 1994) is a Ukrainian professional footballer who plays as a centre-back for Ukrainian club Hirnyk-Sport Horishni Plavni, on loan from Ukrainian club Metalist Kharkiv.

References

External links
 Personal statistics on UAF official website
 

1994 births
Living people
Footballers from Odesa
Ukrainian footballers
Association football central defenders
FC Chornomorets-2 Odesa players
FC Enerhiya Nova Kakhovka players
FC Zhemchuzhyna Odesa players
FC Hirnyk-Sport Horishni Plavni players
FC Lviv players
FC Metalist Kharkiv players
Ukrainian First League players
Ukrainian Second League players
Ukrainian Premier League players